War Story is a Canadian television documentary series, which has aired on History since 2012. Airing between six and thirteen episodes per season, the series examines stories of Canada's military participation in war.

The first three seasons were general examinations of war, with individual episodes focusing on stories from World War II, the Korean War and the Vietnam War, while the fourth season, titled War Story: Afghanistan, focused exclusively on the more recent War in Afghanistan.

At the 2nd Canadian Screen Awards in 2014, director Barry Stevens won the award for Best Direction in a Documentary Series for the first-season episode "Ortona: The War Inside". At the 5th Canadian Screen Awards in 2017, War Story: Afghanistan won the award for History Documentary Program or Series, and Stevens won the award for Best Direction in a Documentary Series for the episode "The Long Way Home". Andrew Theobald was also nominated for the Barbara Sears Award for Editorial Research for the episode "The Long Way Home".

Episodes

Season 1

Season 2

Season 3

Season 4

Season 5

References

External links 

 

2012 Canadian television series debuts
2010s Canadian documentary television series
Documentary television series about war